Betousa is a monotypic moth genus of the family Crambidae described by Francis Walker in 1865. Its only species, Betousa dilecta, was described by the same author in the same year. It is found on the Moluccas, Woodlark Island, St. Aignan, Ternate and Fergusson Island.

References

Pyraustinae
Crambidae genera
Monotypic moth genera
Taxa named by Francis Walker (entomologist)